The A-Hmao language, also known as Large Flowery Miao or Northeast Yunnan Miao, is a Hmongic language spoken in China. It is the language the Pollard script was designed for, and displays extensive tone sandhi. There is a high degree of literacy in Pollard among the older generation.

The standard written language, both in Pollard and in Latin script, is that of  village in Weining County.

Classification 
The A-Hmao language is a branch of the West Hmongic languages, also known as Chuanqiandian Miao and Western Miao, which is a major branch of the Hmongic languages of China and Southeast Asia.

Wang Fushi (1985) grouped the Western Miao languages into eight primary divisions:
 Chuanqiandian Miao
 Northeast Yunnan Miao (A-Hmao language)
 Guiyang Miao
 Huishui Miao
 Mashan Miao
 Luobohe Miao
 Chong'anjiang Miao
 Pingtang Miao'''

Geographic distribution 
The A-Mao language is distributed in Zhaotong, Kunming, Qujing and Chuxiong Yi autonomous prefecture in the Northeast of Yunnan Province. And also Weining Yi, Hui, and Miao autonomous county, Hezhang county, Liupanshui, and Ziyun Miao and Buyi autonomous county in the West of Guizhou Province. There are 300,000 native speakers. The standard dialect is that  of Shimenkan,  Weining County.

Phonology

Consonants

Vowels

Tones 

On the basis of the eight tones of A-Hmao, in the eastern region, the fourth, sixth, and eighth tones are broken up partially or entirely into two categories.  At most, there can be up to eleven tones.  Essentially, nouns and quantifiers are part of the first category, and they are higher in pitch. Other word classes are part of the second category, and they are lower in pitch.

The A-Hmao language displays extensive tone sandhi. Similar to other branches of the West Hmongic languages, the tone sandhi happens on the second syllable when the first syllable of a disyllable word is level tone (first and second tone).

Grammar

Morphology and vocabulary 
The morphology of the three branches of the Hmong language is basically the same. The following examples are from Central Miao. A-Hmao is similar to Hmong, which is an isolating language in which most morphemes are monosyllables. As a result, verbs are not overtly inflected. Tense, aspect, mood, person, number, gender, and case are indicated lexically.

Single-morpheme word

 Monosyllable single-morpheme word. (single-morpheme words are mostly monosyllable in Hmong language)
 Example:
  'human being'
  'tiger'
  'tree'
  'I'
  'you'
  'he'
  'thousand'
  'ten thousand'
  'hundred'
  'come'
  go; 'leave'
 Multisyllable single-morpheme word. (There is a small number of multisyllable single-morpheme words in the Hmong language. Mostly, they are disyllabic, and there are very few with three or more syllables.)
 Alliterative. Example:
  'hurry up; quickly'
  'itchy'
  'nausea'
 Vowel rhyme. Example:
 Same tone:
  'girl'
  'run'
  'boiling'
  'star'
  'cloud'
  'dirty'
 Different tones:
  'clean'
  'in case'
  'magpie'
 Non-alliterative and vowel rhyme. Example:
  'crow'
  'nearly; almost'
  'chair'
 Reiterative syllable. Example:
  'slowly'
  'together'
  'still'
  'occasionally'

Compound word

 Coordinating
 Noun morpheme compound with noun morpheme. Example:
  'language'
  'relative'
  'name'
  'age'
 Verb morpheme compound with verb morpheme. Example:
  'rebuke'
  'construct'
  'lesson'
 Adjective morpheme compound with adjective morpheme. Example:
  'bend'
  'poverty'
 Modifying
 Noun morpheme modifying noun morpheme. Example:
  'candle'
  'key'
  'tears'
  'corn'
 Adjective morpheme modifying noun morpheme. Example:
  'uncle'
  'aunt'
 Dominating
 Verb morpheme dominating noun morpheme. Example:
  'dress up'
  'rest'
 Adjective morpheme dominating noun morpheme. Example:
  'patience'
  'pleasantly cool'
  'proficiency'
  'tired'
 Affixes
  means human or animal body and part, plant part and things related to plants, natural objects, things related to buildings, utensils and abstract objectives. Example:
  'body'
  'ear'
  'root'
  'leaf'
  'living room'
  'kicken'
  'soul'
  'destiny'
  means location. Example:
  'provincial capital'
  on the street
  at home
  means aspect and direction. Example:
  aspect of eating and wearing
  'here'
  'there'
  'where'
  means aspect and direction. Example:
  'above'
  'below'
  'outside'
  'inside'
  means person. Example:
  'child'
  'grandchild'
  'man'
  means person and some kinship terminology. Example:
  'girl'
  'man, boy, husband'
  'uncle'
  means round object. Example:
  'stone'
  'knee'
  'fist'
  means uncertain quantity.
  'a handful of'

Syntax 
The syntax of Hmong languages, regardless of the type of part of speech or phrase and the division of constituents of the sentence and the sentence types, are basically the same. The basic word order of Hmong is SVO. Within the noun phrase, possessors precede possessed nouns, and adjectives and relative clauses follow the nouns they modify. As in Chinese, question formation does not involve word order change. For wh- questions, the wh- word does not occupy a sentence-initial position in Hmong as in many other languages. (e.g. the English sentence 'What are you doing?' would be rendered 'you do what' in Hmong)

Writing system 
The A-Hmao have no indigenous writing system. In the beginning of the 20th century, missionary Samuel Pollard invented the Pollard script, which was based on the decorative symbols on their clothing. Before the introduction of the Pollard script, the A-Hmao people recorded their history through their ancient songs and weaving the history of their memories on their clothes. Those images formed a history of the A-Hmao.

References

Further reading

 
 
  [Big Flowery Miao 大花苗 of Sapushan 洒普山, Wulong Village 乌龙村, Shishan Town 狮山镇, Wuding County, Yunnan]

External links
A-Hmao (Diandongbei) basic lexicon at the Global Lexicostatistical Database
283-word wordlists in Wuding Jiyi A-Hmao 花苗 dialect, elicited in Standard Mandarin, archived with Kaipuleohone. (KG2-003, KG2-019)

West Hmongic languages
Languages of China